Illuminate Light & Laser Spectacular was a seasonal evening show at the Dreamworld theme park on the Gold Coast, Queensland, Australia.

History
On 2 March 2010, Dreamworld announced that they would be adding a light and laser show for the Easter school holidays. The show was included with daily admission, however, guests could purchase a separate Illuminate ticket just to attend the event. The first showing of Illuminate was from 2 April until 16 April 2010. Despite a poor trading period, Ardent Leisure CEO Greg Shaw stated that the launch of Illuminate was a success.

In early May 2010, it was reported that Dreamworld was evaluating the possibility to incorporate Illuminate into night dance parties. Rather than going ahead with dance parties, Dreamworld began to incorporate the show into the existing Screamworld night events.

In the June/July holidays of 2010 Illuminate returned alongside a "Winter Wonderland".

Illuminate has since returned in 4 other school holiday periods (including the Summer Funomenon) and several Screamworld events.

Show
Illuminate Light & Laser Spectacular was created by Australian entertainment company Laservision. Laservision is the company responsible the world's largest light and sound display, A Symphony of Lights in Hong Kong, as well as the lasers inside the Scooby Doo Spooky Coaster at Warner Bros. Movie World on the Gold Coast.

Segments

Illuminate may show one or more of the following segments in addition to an introduction segment:
 Aurora Australis – based upon the natural light display of the same name (also known as the Southern Lights), the Aurora Australis segment features a variety of light and laser techniques to recreate an aurora.
 Love Today – set to the Mika song of the same name, the Love Today segment recreates the 2010 commercial on the main water screen.
 SpongeBob SquarePants – by utilising the main water screen, an episode of SpongeBob SquarePants is played. This segment will no longer be utilised after the termination of Dreamworld's contract with Nickelodeon.

Infrastructure
Dreamworld has permanately installed the following in Main Street to allow them to consistently run Illuminate in school holiday periods.
 Three high-power laser systems
 Six smoke machines
 Search lights
 LEDs
 Surround sound

See also
 A Symphony of Lights

References

External links
 
 Laservision

Dreamworld (Australia)